The Beautiful and the Damned is the debut and only album released by Australian alternative/punk rock band Lash. Released in April 2002, the album peaked at number 74 on the ARIA Charts.

Reception
Gemma Turner from Pulse said "It's a solid effort, which rocks the stereo system. Pop melodies are blended with a gritty rock sound with highlights including the edgy 'Don't Ever Make My Mind Up' and harmonious 'Live or Lie'."

Track listing
 "Take Me Away" – 3:34
 "Don't Ever Make My Mind Up" – 3:16
 "Better Than You" – 4:15
 "Do It" – 3:23
 "Beauty Queen" – 3:46
 "Live or Lie"	– 3:44
 "Caged My Soul" – 3:46
 "In My Head" – 3:53
 "Dumb" – 3:57
 "Only to Heal" – 6:38

Charts

Release history

References

2002 debut albums